Cadoneghe is a town and comune in the province of Padua, in the Veneto region of northern Italy. The city is situated on the Brenta River.

Cadoneghe was once famous for being the site of the largest and most important slaughterhouse and meat company in Europe, Grosoli SpA. After the Grosoli family sold the company in the early 1980s, the company gradually lost its market and was eventually closed in the early 1990s, leaving Cadoneghe without any major industry.

Cadoneghe in 1975 was chosen as the best city of the Padova and Italy.

Notable people
Lino Cauzzo (1924–1998), professional footballer

Cities and towns in Veneto